José Rojas (born February 24, 1993) is an American professional baseball infielder for the Doosan Bears of the KBO League. He attended Fullerton College and Vanguard University. Rojas was selected by the Los Angeles Angels in the 36th round of the 2016 MLB draft, and made his MLB debut with them in 2021.

Amateur career
Rojas attended Anaheim High School in Anaheim, California. Undrafted out of high school, Rojas attended Fullerton College in Fullerton, California for two years (2013 and 2014). He then transferred to Vanguard University in Costa Mesa, California for his final two years (2015 and 2016) of college baseball. Rojas was selected by the Los Angeles Angels in the 36th round, with the 1086th overall selection, of the 2016 MLB draft.

Professional career

Los Angeles Angels
Rojas made his professional debut in 2016 with the Orem Owlz, hitting .308/.372/.471/.843 with five home runs and 31 RBI. He split the 2017 season between the Inland Empire 66ers and the Mobile BayBears, combining to hit .286/.321/.438/.759 with 11 home runs and 70 RBI. 

Rojas split the 2018 season between Mobile and the Salt Lake Bees, hitting a combined .289/.355/.501/.856 with 17 home runs and 71 RBI. He was assigned back to Salt Lake for the 2019 season, slashing .293/.362/.577 with 101 runs (2nd in the league), 39 doubles (2nd), 7 triples (3rd), 31 home runs (5th), 107 RBIs (leading the league), and 141 strikeouts (5th) over 126 games. Rojas did not play at all in 2020 due to the cancellation of the Minor League Baseball season because of the COVID-19 pandemic.

On March 31, 2021, the Angels selected Rojas to the 40-man roster. He made his major league debut on April 2, pinch hitting for Max Stassi. On April 14, Rojas recorded his first major league hit off of Kansas City Royals pitcher Tyler Zuber. In 216 at bats in AAA, he hit .259/.328/.431. 

On May 23, 2022, Rojas was designated for assignment. On May 30, Rojas cleared waivers and was outrighted to Triple-A Salt Lake. On August 2, the Angels selected his contract from Salt Lake. On September 1, Rojas was again designated for assignment. In 280 at bats in AAA, he batted .275/.350/.571.

In his career in the major leagues with the Angels, he played 31 games in right field, 24 games at third base, 14 games at second base, 10 games in left field, and 2 games at first base. In 224 at bats, he hit .188/.245/.339.

San Francisco Giants
On September 4, 2022, Rojas was claimed off waivers by the San Francisco Giants. On September 16, 2022, Rojas was designated for assignment by the Giants and elected free agency on September 18.

Doosan Bears
On October 26, 2022, Rojas signed a one-year deal with the Doosan Bears of the KBO League.

References

External links

Vanguard Lions bio

1993 births
Living people
Baseball players from Anaheim, California
Bravos de Margarita players
American expatriate baseball players in Venezuela
Inland Empire 66ers of San Bernardino players
Los Angeles Angels players
Major League Baseball infielders
Mobile BayBears players
Orem Owlz players
Salt Lake Bees players
Vanguard Lions baseball players
Yaquis de Obregón players
American expatriate baseball players in Mexico
Doosan Bears players